Miguel Hernández is a station on Line 1 of the Madrid Metro. It is located in fare Zone A. It was opened on 7 April 1994.

References 

Line 1 (Madrid Metro) stations
Railway stations in Spain opened in 1994
Buildings and structures in Puente de Vallecas District, Madrid